Samuel Onyango Ouma (born 30 November 1994) is a Kenyan international footballer who plays for Gor Mahia, as a midfielder.

Career
Born in Migori, he has played club football for SoNy Sugar, Ulinzi Stars and Gor Mahia.

He made his international debut for Kenya in 2017.

References

1994 births
Living people
Kenyan footballers
Kenya international footballers
SoNy Sugar F.C. players
Ulinzi Stars F.C. players
Gor Mahia F.C. players
Association football midfielders